Thomas T. Duffy was a member of the Wisconsin State Assembly.

Biography
Duffy was born on December 6, 1835 in New York City. He moved to Benton, Wisconsin in 1855 and graduated from Sinsinawa Mound College in 1858.

Career
Duffy was elected to the Assembly in 1869. Previously, he was Treasurer of Benton and a justice of the peace in 1868. He was a Democrat.

References

Politicians from New York City
People from Benton, Wisconsin
American justices of the peace
Sinsinawa Mound College alumni
1835 births
Year of death missing
Democratic Party members of the Wisconsin State Assembly